Saint Vitus (290-303) is a Christian saint, dying martyred during the Roman persecution of Christians.

Saint Vitus, St-Vitus, or variation, may also refer to:

Saint Vitus (venue), a bar and music venue in Brooklyn, New York
Saint Vitus (band), an American doom metal band
St. Vitus (drink), a German bitters

St. Vitus's Church (disambiguation), several churches and cathedrals of the name
 Saint Vitus Day, the Saint's feast day, celebrated on June 15 on the Julian calendar and June 28 on the Gregorian calendar
 Saint Vitus' dance (disambiguation)

See also

 Sankt Veit (disambiguation)
 San Vito (disambiguation)
 St. Vith, Belgium 
 Battle of St. Vith (1944) during WWII
 Canton of Sankt-Vith, Belgium; part of Eupen Sankt Vith
 
 
 Vitus (disambiguation)